Lena Andersson (born 18 April 1970) is a Swedish author and journalist. She won the August Prize in 2013 for the novel Wilful Disregard. In the same year, the same book won her the Literature Prize given by the Swedish newspaper Svenska Dagbladet.

Bibliography
Var det bra så? (novel, 1999)
Duktiga män och kvinnor (2001)
Du är alltså svensk? (novel, 2004)
Duck City (novel, 2006)
Slutspelat (novel, 2009)
Förnuft och högmod (novel, 2011)
Wilful Disregard (novel, translated by Sarah Death, 2013)
Ingens mamma (anthology, 2013)
Utan personligt ansvar (novel, 2014)
Acts of Infidelity (novel, translated by Saskia Vogel, 2018)
 Son of Svea  (novel, translated by Sarah Death, 2022)

References

20th-century Swedish novelists
21st-century Swedish novelists
August Prize winners
Swedish women novelists
Writers from Stockholm
1970 births
Living people
20th-century Swedish women writers
21st-century Swedish women writers